Frédéric Nsabiyumva (born 26 April 1995) is a Burundian footballer who plays as a defender for Västerås in Sweden and for the Burundi national football team.

International career
He was invited by Lofty Naseem, the national team coach, to represent Burundi in the 2014 African Nations Championship held in South Africa.

Career statistics

International

Statistics accurate as of 30 October 2022

References

1995 births
Living people
Burundian footballers
Burundi international footballers
2014 African Nations Championship players
Jomo Cosmos F.C. players
Chippa United F.C. players
Västerås SK Fotboll players
Association football defenders
Burundi A' international footballers
2019 Africa Cup of Nations players
Burundian expatriate footballers
Expatriate soccer players in South Africa
Burundian expatriate sportspeople in South Africa
Expatriate footballers in Sweden
Burundian expatriate sportspeople in Sweden
South African Premier Division players
National First Division players
Superettan players